Sang-e Sefid (also Romanized as Sang-e Sefīd) is a village in Bakhtegan Rural District, Abadeh Tashk District, Neyriz County, Fars Province, Iran. At the 2006 census, its population was 50, in 13 families.

References 

Populated places in Abadeh Tashk County